was a Japanese editor, writer, and translator.

A graduate of Meiji University's French Literature Department, he joined Hayakawa Shobō, a publishing company, where he stayed until 1975 specializing in translating French literature, translating, among others, works by André Maurois, Boris Vian, Georges Simenon, Maurice Leblanc.  In 1985, he published . He also used the pseudonym .

He died on October 14, 2013, of heart failure.

References

1936 births
2013 deaths
Japanese editors
French–Japanese translators
Japanese mystery writers
Writers from Tokyo
Japanese scholars of French literature
20th-century Japanese translators
Meiji University alumni